Khuit I was an Egyptian queen who lived in the mid-5th Dynasty of Egypt.

She was buried in mastaba D 14 at Saqqara. The Austrian Egyptologist Wilfried Seipel has suggested that was the queen of pharaoh Menkauhor Kaiu. Based on the datation of the tombs surrounding Khuit's burial, Seipel argues that she lived during the mid-Fifth Dynasty. Proceeding by elimination, Seipel attributed known queens to each king of the period, which only leaves Menkauhor as a candidate king for her. These arguments are criticized by the French Egyptologist Michel Baud, who observes that pharaohs could have had more than one queen.

Another queen by the name of Meresankh IV is more commonly suggested as the wife of Menkauhor Kaiu and thus may have been a contemporary of Khuit.

Khuit held the titles Great one of the hetes-sceptre (wrt-hetes), She who sees Horus and Seth (m33t-hrw-stsh), Great of Praises, King’s Wife, his beloved, Attendant of the Great One, King’s Daughter, and King’s Wife.

Sources 

25th-century BC women
Queens consort of the Fifth Dynasty of Egypt